The Great Western Railway 3252 or Duke Class were 4-4-0 steam locomotives with outside frames and parallel domed boilers. They were built in five batches between 1895 and 1899 for express passenger train work in Devon and Cornwall. William Dean was their designer, possibly with the collaboration of his assistant, George Jackson Churchward. Four prototype 4-4-0s, of the Armstrong Class, had already been built in 1894.

Design

Frames and wheels
The outside frames of the Dukes were curved upwards over each pair of driving wheels. The first 40 members of the class were fitted with Mansell pattern bogie wheels with wooden centres. The first 25 tenders built also had Mansell pattern wheels, and a shorter than normal wheelbase of  so that the locomotives would fit on the smaller turntables then in use west of Newton Abbot. The engine bogie was of a centre-less type designed by Dean.

Boilers
The majority of the class were fitted with round-topped fireboxes of the same diameter as the boiler. The last four were fitted with Belpaire fireboxes, raised a few inches above the boilers. Eighteen of the Duke class were later rebuilt with domeless tapered boilers and Belpaire fireboxes between October 1906 and January 1909. They were reclassified as members of the Bulldog Class. A further Duke, no. 3273 Armorel, had been fitted with a parallel domeless boiler in February 1902, converting it to a Camel Class locomotive. It was fitted with a Bulldog-type boiler in October 1910. Duke no. 3258, King Arthur, built August 1895, was fitted with a superheater in December 1896. The rest of the class, with the exception of two locomotives, were fitted with superheaters between August 1911 and September 1946. The class had distinctive long smokeboxes, extended to hold a diaphragm plate and net for spark prevention.

Cylinders and valves
Slide valves were fitted underneath the cylinders, and were driven directly by eccentrics on the leading driving axle through Stephenson valve gear. This position had the advantage that, when the regulator was closed and steam pressure shut off, the valves would drop away from the steam ports, thus reducing wear on the valves and port faces. The Dukes had  diameter cylinders, possibly due to permanent way weight restrictions and a reduced supply of steam from the Dukes' smaller boilers.

Renumbering
The Dukes were subject to the 1912 renumbering of GWR 4-4-0 locomotives. Those Dukes rebuilt as Bulldogs were renumbered as members of that class in the series 3300–3455. The remaining Dukes were renumbered consecutively as 3252–3291, this block of numbers having previously been allocated to the first batch of Duke Class locomotives.

Rebuilding
By the 1930s many of the Duke class were becoming uneconomical to repair, particularly with regard to the curved outside frames, which were weaker than the later straight-topped version. A number of the class had been transferred to the ex-Cambrian Railways main line, where permanent way restrictions debarred the use of heavier locomotives.

In December 1929, no. 3265, Tre Pol and Pen, was withdrawn, and the cylinders and motion, together with a spare Duke boiler and smokebox, were fitted to the straight-topped frames and cab of Bulldog no. 3365 Charles Grey Mott. The rebuilt locomotive retained the name and number of the Duke. The reduction in axle weight, as compared to the Bulldogs, allowed for working over the Cambrian section.

From 1936 a further twenty-nine of the Dukes were withdrawn and replaced by Bulldogs fitted with Duke boilers and motion, reclassified as Earl Class locomotives. The onset of World War II brought a halt to the program, the last replacement being in November 1939, leaving ten Dukes to pass into British Railways ownership. These were scrapped between June 1949 and July 1951, the last survivor being No. 9089, formerly no. 3289 St Austell of July 1899.

In fiction
The fate of the Dukes are mentioned by Duck the Great Western Engine in the Reverend Wilbert Awdry's children's book Very Old Engines.

Summary table

References

Bibliography

3252
4-4-0 locomotives
Scrapped locomotives
Standard gauge steam locomotives of Great Britain
Railway locomotives introduced in 1895
Passenger locomotives